The 2011 2000 Guineas Stakes was the 203rd running of the 2000 Guineas Stakes horse race. It was run over one mile at Newmarket Racecourse on 30 April 2011.

This race was the sixth of Frankel's unbeaten 14 race winning streak, his second win as a 3-year-old and his second Group 1 victory, following his victory in the Dewhurst Stakes at the same racecourse in 2010.

Rerouted was entered into the race primarily to act as a pacemaker to the highly promising Frankel, however with Frankel being drawn in stall number one and Rerouted in stall number thirteen, the opposite side of the Rowley Mile racecourse at Newmarket, the pacemaking job was almost rendered obsolete.

Such was Frankel's pace that he drew clear from the field from the off, pacemaker and all.  Where some may have considered it a risk for jockey Tom Queally to allow Frankel to set its own pace, it became clear that Frankel was a very special horse on this day as he quickly established an insurmountable lead and won the race in one of the most dominant displays in any British classic.

Race details
 Sponsor: QIPCO
 Winner's prize money: £198,695
 Going: Good to firm
 Number of runners: 13
 Winner's time: 1 minute, 37.30 seconds

Full result

* The distances between the horses are shown in lengths

Winner details
Further details of the winner, Frankel:

 Foaled: 11 February 2008, in Great Britain
 Sire: Galileo; Dam: Kind (Danehill)
 Owner: Khalid Abdulla
 Breeder: Juddmonte Farms

Form analysis

Two-year-old races
Notable runs by the future 2000 Guineas participants as two-year-olds in 2010:

 Frankel – 1st in Royal Lodge Stakes, Dewhurst Stakes
 Dubawi Gold – 2nd in Woodcote Stakes, 10th in Norfolk Stakes, 11th in Gimcrack Stakes, 9th in Racing Post Trophy
 Native Khan – 1st in Solario Stakes, 4th in Racing Post Trophy
 Slim Shadey – 6th in Chesham Stakes, 2nd in Washington Singer Stakes, 5th in Royal Lodge Stakes
 Pathfork – 1st in Futurity Stakes, 1st in Vincent O'Brien National Stakes
 Rerouted – 1st in Somerville Tattersall Stakes, 4th in Critérium International
 Casamento – 2nd in Vincent O'Brien National Stakes, 1st in Beresford Stakes, 1st in Racing Post Trophy
 Roderic O'Connor – 2nd in Dewhurst Stakes, 1st in Critérium International
 Saamidd – 1st in Champagne Stakes, 6th in Dewhurst Stakes
 Broox – 2nd in Prix Robert Papin, 4th in Prix Morny, 1st in Prix d'Arenberg, 9th in Critérium de Maisons-Laffitte

The road to Newmarket
Early-season appearances in 2011, prior to running in the 2000 Guineas:

 Frankel – 1st in Greenham Stakes
 Dubawi Gold – 1st in Lingfield Spring Cup, 1st in Lingfield International Trial Stakes
 Native Khan – 1st in Craven Stakes
 Happy Today – 2nd in Feilden Stakes
 Rerouted – 2nd in European Free Handicap

Subsequent Group 1 wins
Group 1 victories after running in the 2000 Guineas:

 Frankel – St James's Palace Stakes (2011), Sussex Stakes (2011, 2012), Queen Elizabeth II Stakes (2011), Lockinge Stakes (2012), Queen Anne Stakes (2012), International Stakes (2012), Champion Stakes (2012)
 Roderic O'Connor – Irish 2000 Guineas

References

2011 in British sport
2011 in English sport
2000 Guineas
2010s in Suffolk
2000 Guineas Stakes